Avery Williams (born July 15, 1998) is an American football running back for the Atlanta Falcons of the National Football League (NFL). He played college football at Boise State.

Early life and high school
Williams was born to Pam Veasey and Marvin Williams on July 15, 1998. He grew up in Pasadena, California and originally attended Saint Francis High School before transferring to JSerra Catholic High School before his senior year. As a senior, Williams was named Trinity League co-Most Valuable Player after rushing for 1,175 yards and 14 touchdowns on offense at running back and was also an All-Area selection at defensive back. He received no scholarship offers to play college football and enrolled at Boise State after being offered to join the team as a preferred walk-on.

College career
Williams joined Boise State's football team as a walk-on and redshirted his true freshman season. He was named the Special Teams Scout Team Player of the Year during his redshirt year and awarded a scholarship during fall preseason training camp in 2017. Williams became the team's punt and kick returner as well as a starter at cornerback during his redshirt freshman season and finished the season with two interceptions and eight passes broken up and also returned two punts for touchdowns and was named second-team All-Mountain West Conference.

As a redshirt sophomore, Williams recorded 49 tackles with 11 passes defended, two interceptions and three forced fumbles and returned a kickoff for a touchdown and was named honorable mention All-Mountain West. He was again named honorable mention All-Mountain West after recording 39 tackles with four passes broken up and returning 22 punts for 290 yards and two touchdowns in his junior season. As a senior, Williams returned 19 kickoffs for 533 yards and two touchdowns and 15 punts for 229 yards and two touchdowns, tying the NCAA Division I career record with nine return touchdowns. He was named first-team All-Mountain West and the Conference Special Teams Player of the Year as a returner and was a consensus first-team All-American selection as an all-purpose player.

Professional career

Williams was drafted by the Atlanta Falcons in the fifth round (183rd overall) of the 2021 NFL Draft. He signed his four-year rookie contract with Atlanta on June 15, 2021. He was the Falcons primary kick and punt returner as well as a core special teamer and gunner in 2021.

In the 2022 offseason, the Falcons moved Williams to running back, going back to his primary position in high school.

References

External links

Boise State Broncos bio
Atlanta Falcons bio

Living people
Players of American football from Pasadena, California
All-American college football players
American football cornerbacks
Boise State Broncos football players
African-American players of American football
Atlanta Falcons players
1998 births
21st-century African-American sportspeople
American football running backs